Ciudad Deportiva de El Viso is the training ground of Málaga CF. It is located in the Andalusian city of Málaga.

Facilities
Ciudad Deportiva Stadium with a capacity of 1,300 seats.
1 grass pitch.
2 mini grass pitches.
Service centre with gymnasium.

References

External links
 Ciudad Deportiva de El Viso

Viso
Málaga CF
Sports venues completed in 1990